Nüpode Huitoto or Nɨpode is an indigenous American language spoken in western South America. It has occasionally been referred to as Muinane Witoto, not to be confused with the Muinane language.

Classification
Nüpode Huitoto belongs to the Witotoan language family.  Along with Mɨnɨca and Murai, it is one of the three Witoto Proper languages.

Geographic distribution
Nüpode Huitito is spoken by just 100 people in Peru's northeastern Loreto province, where it has official standing. Speakers also use the other two Huitoto languages (Murui and Minica). It is written using the Roman alphabet and has had some Bible portions translated into it. In addition, a dictionary and grammar have been written.

Phonology

Consonants

Vowels

References

Witotoan languages

Languages of Peru